The Taylor–Southgate Bridge is a continuous truss bridge that was built in 1995. The bridge carries U.S. Route 27 across the Ohio River, connecting Newport, Kentucky and Cincinnati, Ohio.

Some regard this bridge, which was a replacement for the Cincinnati-Newport Bridge built by Samuel Bigstaff, as a little too plain in its design for a major urban bridge, especially considering many cities today are opting for a more elegant design, such as a cable stayed bridge.

The bridge is named for the families of James Taylor, Jr. and Richard Southgate, two important early settlers of Newport. Richard was the father of William Wright Southgate, a pre Civil War Congressman from northern Kentucky.

The bridge replaced the Cincinnati-Newport Bridge, a truss bridge built in 1890. Commonly known as Central Bridge, it was demolished in 1992.

See also
 
 
 
 
 
 List of crossings of the Ohio River

References

External links
 Taylor-Southgate Bridge at Bridges & Tunnels
 Taylor-Southgate Bridge at Cincinnati-Transit

Bridges over the Ohio River
Bridges in Cincinnati
Road bridges in Kentucky
Road bridges in Ohio
Continuous truss bridges in the United States
Steel bridges in the United States
Bridges completed in 1995
Buildings and structures in Campbell County, Kentucky
Newport, Kentucky
Bridges of the United States Numbered Highway System
U.S. Route 27
1995 establishments in Ohio
1995 establishments in Kentucky
Transportation in Campbell County, Kentucky